Andreas Hofer (born 19 May 1962) is a German film actor. He appeared in more than forty films since 1987.

Selected filmography

References

External links
 

1962 births
Living people
People from Osnabrück
German male film actors
German male television actors